Antsahavaribe is a town and commune in northern Madagascar. It belongs to the district of Vohemar, which is a part of Sava Region. The population of the commune was estimated to be approximately 9,000 in the 2001 census.

Only primary schooling is available. 99.98% of the population of the commune are farmers. The most important crop is vanilla, while other important products are coffee, sugarcane and rice. Services provide employment for 0.02% of the population.

References and notes 

Populated places in Sava Region